Zəyəm (also, Dzagam, Dzegam, Dzegan, Guseynbeili, Guseynbeyli, Pzegam, and Star Agozam) is a village and municipality in the Shamkir Rayon of Azerbaijan.  It has a population of 7,775.

References 

Populated places in Shamkir District